Hit-Girl is a fictional character.

Hit-Girl, Hit Girl, or Hitgirl may also refer to:

Hit-Girl (comic book), a comic with the above character as the main character
"Hit Girl" (song), a 2007 single by Sébastien Léger
Hit Girls, a 2013 Australian martial arts action comedy short film
Hitgirl, a film with Sophie Alexander
Hitgirl, a 2022 collaboration album with Dreezy and Hit-Boy

See also
"Hitgirl" for Selma; see Patric Ullaeus#Music Videos
"Even Hitgirls Get the Blues"; see Garth Ennis bibliography